The purple-lined wrasse (Cirrhilabrus lineatus), also known as the lavender wrasse, is a species of wrasse native to coral reefs of New Caledonia and Australia, where it can be found at depths from . It can be found in the aquarium trade. As a member of the family Labridae, Cirrhilabrus lineatus displays hermaphroditic behavior where a female may become a male when it is biologically favorable to do so. Generally, this occurs when competition from larger males disappears.

References

Purple-lined wrasse
Taxa named by John Ernest Randall
Taxa named by Roger Lubbock
Labridae
Fish described in 1982